Just Loomis (born January 1957 in Reno, Nevada) is a fine art photographer known for his portraiture and fashion photography. His work has been published and exhibited internationally and has appeared in Harper's Bazaar, British Vogue, Vanity Fair, The New Yorker, and The New York Times Magazine. His book of American portraits, "As We Are" was published in 2010 by Hatje Cantz.

Career

Early work
Just Loomis began taking photographs in the 1970s. His earliest work, taken when he was in high school, focused on the people and landscapes around Reno, Nevada, where he was raised.

Recent work
Hatje Cantz in Berlin published Loomis' work in a book. "As We Are" was published in 2010, was nominated for the Deutscher Fotobuchpreis, and was named "Photobook of the Year" by Communication Arts and PDN magazines. The publication of "As We Are" led to a one-man exhibit of the work at the Stenersen Museum in Oslo, Norway.

Loomis has just completed a project on the Volksbuehne theater in Berlin and is preparing his second book with Hatje Cantz.

Awards
1986 - Nominated for the Grammy Award for Best Recording Package for A-ha's Hunting High and Low

Exhibitions
March 2017, Rausch und Kontrolle, Volksbuehne Theater, Berlin
November 2013, Women, Hiltawsky Gallery, Berlin 
June 2012, Three Boys, Williamson Gallery, Art Center College of Design, Pasadena 
February 2010, As We Are and Aha the Photographs, Stenersen Museum, Oslo 
June 2009, Three Boys, Helmut Newton Foundation, Berlin 
May 2009, Walk Away, Lincoln Center, New York

References

External links
http://www.hatjecantz.de/just-loomis-5073-1.html
http://www.hatjecantz.de/just-loomis-2533-1.html
http://www.justloomis.com/about
http://articles.latimes.com/2012/jun/24/image/la-ig-helmut-20120624
https://web.archive.org/web/20150402134724/http://www.threeboysfrompasadena.com/
http://epubs.nsla.nv.gov/statepubs/epubs/210777-1993-4winter.pdf

Fine art photographers
American portrait photographers
1957 births
Living people
Businesspeople from Reno, Nevada
Photography academics
Photographers from California
Academy of Art University faculty
20th-century American photographers
21st-century American photographers